Mahinda Yapa Abeywardena (born 10 October 1945) is a Sri Lankan politician and landed proprietor. He is the current Speaker of the Sri Lankan Parliament.

Political career
He first entered parliament in 1983 as the Hakmana United National Party and has been active in politics for more than 30 years.

Mahinda Yapa Abeywardena was a young MP when he openly criticised the 1987 Indo-Sri Lanka Accord for a new provincial councils system to be established in Sri Lanka. He along with Chandrakumara Wijeya Gunawardena, the member for Kamburupitiya voted against the bill in Parliament becoming the only two government members who voted against it. He was later removed by the then President J. R. Jayewardene from his Parliamentary seat for violation of the party rules by not voting for the bill.

He later joined hands with Gamini Dissanayake and Lalith Athulathmudali (who were also against the Indo-Sri Lanka Accord) as they too quit United National Party and formed the Democratic United National Front or aka 'Rajaliya-front'. Mahinda Yapa Abeywardena then contested for Southern Provincial Council under DUNF and won. He was then elected as the opposition leader of the Southern Provincial Council in 1993, and he became the Chief Minister of the Southern Provincial Council in 1994. Elected twice as the Chief Minister he was in office from 1994 to 2001. He is said to be one of the most successful Chief Ministers from the south for developing the infrastructures that were neglected for more than 5 years due to the dark era of the country.

He left office to contest in the 2001 general elections and become an opposition MP and served until 2004. After the 2004 General elections, he became the Deputy Minister of Healthcare and later the Cabinet Minister for Cultural Affairs & National Heritage. After the 2010 General Elections, he was appointed as the Minister of Agriculture. Having been in office as the Minister of Agriculture for several years he was elected Vice Chairman at the 38th session of the Food and Agricultural Organization of the United Nations FAO Conference held in Rome, Italy in 2013. He was again appointed as the Minister of Parliamentary Affairs in 2015 for a brief period until he resigned and joined the opposition. 

He is a representative of Matara District for the United People's Freedom Alliance in the Parliament of Sri Lanka. He resides in Kalubowila, Dehiwala.

See also
 Cabinet of Sri Lanka

References

External links
 Parliament of Sri Lanka profile

|-

|-

1945 births
Living people
Sri Lankan Buddhists
Members of the 8th Parliament of Sri Lanka
Members of the 11th Parliament of Sri Lanka
Members of the 12th Parliament of Sri Lanka
Members of the 13th Parliament of Sri Lanka
Members of the 14th Parliament of Sri Lanka
Members of the 15th Parliament of Sri Lanka
Members of the 16th Parliament of Sri Lanka
Sri Lanka Podujana Peramuna politicians
Chief Ministers of Southern Province, Sri Lanka
Members of the Southern Provincial Council
Sri Lanka Freedom Party politicians
United People's Freedom Alliance politicians
People from Matara, Sri Lanka
Culture ministers of Sri Lanka